The following events occurred in May 1954:

May 1, 1954 (Saturday)
The Unification Church is founded in South Korea, by Sun Myung Moon, under the name Holy Spirit Association for the Unification of World Christianity (HSA-UWC). 
A general strike begins in Honduras, lasting until July.
The Myasishchev M-4, the first Soviet bomber which is claimed has the ability to reach the United States and return to the Soviet Union, is displayed to the public for the first time at the Moscow May Day parade.
The 1954 Asian Games open in Manila, Philippines, lasting until May 9.
The Film Censorship Board of Malaysia is established.
Born: Maatia Toafa, Tuvaluan politician, twice prime minister
Died: Tom Tyler, 50, US actor, of heart failure and complications from scleroderma

May 2, 1954 (Sunday)
Adnan Menderes of the Democrat Party forms the new (21st) government of Turkey after a landslide victory in the country's general election.
Yitzhak Ben-Zvi, the President of Israel, visits the Shrine of the Báb, a centre of the Baháʼí Faith, the first time that the head of an independent state has visited a Baha'i sacred site.
The US-registered 1,007-ton barge A F L 1654 is wrecked on the coast of Montague Island, off the coast of the Territory of Alaska.

May 3, 1954 (Monday)
Died: Józef Garbień, 57, Polish footballer and physician

May 4, 1954 (Tuesday)
Photographer Orlando Suero travels to Georgetown (Washington, D.C.) to spend several days on a photoshoot with the recently married Senator John F. Kennedy and his wife Jackie.

May 5, 1954 (Wednesday)
In Paraguay, President Federico Chávez is ousted in a violent coup led by General Alfredo Stroessner, and is replaced by Tomás Romero Pereira, who later cedes power to Stroessner.
The Maggio Musicale Fiorentino opens in Florence, Italy, with a performance of Gaspare Spontini's opera, Agnese di Hohenstaufen.
Died: Henri Laurens, 69, French sculptor

May 6, 1954 (Thursday)
Roger Bannister runs the first sub-four minute mile, at the Iffley Road track in Oxford, England.
A United States Navy Martin PBM-5 Mariner flying boat crashes into mountains near Carricitos, Mexico, killing all 10 people on board.
Died: B. C. Forbes, 73, Scottish-born US journalist and publisher

May 7, 1954 (Friday)
First Indochina War: The Battle of Dien Bien Phu ends in a French defeat.

May 8, 1954 (Saturday)
The Asian Football Confederation (AFC) is formed in Manila, Philippines.
In England and Wales, the 1954 County Championship cricket tournament opens with matches at Bristol, Derby, Manchester, Northampton, Nottingham, Lord's and Kennington Oval.

May 9, 1954 (Sunday)
The US-registered 9-ton,  fishing vessel Sinbad sinks at Gravina Point in Prince William Sound on the coast of the Territory of Alaska.

May 10, 1954 (Monday)
It is thought to have foundered with the loss of all 50 crew.

May 11, 1954 (Tuesday)
U.S. Secretary of State, John Foster Dulles, declares that Indochina is important but not essential to the security of Southeast Asia, thus ending any prospect of American intervention on the side of France (→ proposed Operation Vulture).

May 12, 1954 (Wednesday)

May 13, 1954 (Thursday)
On the day after the deadline for all male British subjects and Federal citizens between the ages of 18 and 20 to register for part-time National Service, a peaceful demonstration by students turns into a riot, resulting in multiple injuries and arrests.
A Royal Commission on Espionage is established by Australia's government to look into the "Petrov Affair", events surrounding the defection of a Soviet diplomat. 
The World Chess Championship is won by Mikhail Botvinnik in Moscow.
Born: Johnny Logan, Irish singer and songwriter, in Melbourne, Australia, as Seán Patrick Michael Sherrard

May 14, 1954 (Friday)
The Boeing 707 is released after about two years of development.
The Hague Convention for the Protection of Cultural Property in the Event of Armed Conflict is adopted in The Hague, Netherlands.
The British tug Harrington capsizes and sinks at Swansea, Wales, with the loss of two of her six crew.
Died: Heinz Guderian, 65, German World War II general

May 15, 1954 (Saturday)
The Latin Union (Unión Latina) is created by the Convention of Madrid. Its member countries use the five Romance languages: Italian, French, Spanish, Portuguese, and Romanian. It will suspend operations in 2012.
The US-registered 11-ton fishing vessel Loyal is destroyed by fire in Kimshan Cove in Southeast Alaska.

May 16, 1954 (Sunday)
The Kengir uprising breaks out at a Soviet labour camp for political prisoners in the Kazakh SSR. Prisoners force the guards and camp administration out and an internal "government" is set up. The uprising lasts for over a month until forcibly suppressed by Soviet government troops.

May 17, 1954 (Monday)
Brown v. Board of Education of Topeka (347 US 483 1954): The U.S. Supreme Court rules unanimously that segregated schools are unconstitutional.

May 18, 1954 (Tuesday)
Chinese Civil War, First Taiwan Strait Crisis: The People's Liberation Army Navy auxiliary gunboat Rujin is sunk by Nationalist Republic P-47 Thunderbolt aircraft, resulting in 56 deaths.

May 19, 1954 (Wednesday)
Pakistan and the United States sign a Mutual Defense Assistance Agreement.
Died: Charles Ives, 79, US composer

May 20, 1954 (Thursday)
Chiang Kai-shek is reelected as the president of the Republic of China by the National Assembly.

May 21, 1954 (Friday)
The 1954 Giro d'Italia cycle race begins in Palermo, continuing until 13 June. Favourite Fausto Coppi and his team win the team time trial on the first day.

May 22, 1954 (Saturday)
The US-registered 19-ton fishing vessel Flamingo sinks off the Outer Rocks in Khaz Bay, Southeast Alaska.
Died: Chief Bender, 70, Native American baseball player (Philadelphia Athletics) and a member of the MLB Hall of Fame (prostate cancer)

May 23, 1954 (Sunday)
In a friendly international at the Nepstadion in Budapest, the Hungary national football team defeat England by 7 goals to 1. Sándor Kocsis and Ferenc Puskás are among Hungary's goal scorers in what remains England's worst defeat of all time.
Born: Gerry Armstrong, former Northern Irish football player and coach, who was the highest scoring player from the UK in the 1982 FIFA World Cup; including a shock winner against hosts Spain.

May 24, 1954 (Monday)

May 25, 1954 (Tuesday)
Yu Hung-chun (O. K. Yui) is elected Prime Minister of the Republic of China (Taiwan).
Born: Tantely Andrianarivo, Madagascan politician, prime minister 1998–2002
Died: Robert Capa, 40, Hungarian-born photojournalist, killed by a land mine while reporting on the First Indochina War.

May 26, 1954 (Wednesday)
The first tropical storm of the 1954 Atlantic hurricane season forms over Florida.
Died: Omer Nishani, 67, Albanian politician (probable suicide)

May 27, 1954 (Thursday)

May 28, 1954 (Friday)
Born: João Carlos de Oliveira, Brazilian athlete, in Pindamonhangaba, São Paulo

May 29, 1954 (Saturday)
Robert Menzies's government is reelected for a fourth term in Australia.
The first meeting of the Bilderberg group opens at the Hotel de Bilderberg in Oosterbeek, Netherlands.
Diane Leather becomes the first woman to run a sub-five minute mile, in Birmingham, UK.
The French Open tennis tournament concludes, with Tony Trabert as the men's singles champion and Maureen Connolly as the women's.

May 30, 1954 (Sunday)
The Hungarian passenger steamboat Pajtás capsizes and sinks on Lake Balaton, near Balatonfüred. Twenty-three of the 178 passengers are killed.
Turkey's Kırşehir Province becomes part of Nevşehir Province, after supporting the political opposition in the election of May 2.

May 31, 1954 (Monday)
The 1954 Indianapolis 500 motor race is won by Bill Vukovich.
In Canada, Winnipeg's first television station, CBWT, broadcasts its first programmes. 
A Douglas C-47A-80-DL Skytrain operated by Transportes Aéreos Nacionales, on a flight from Governador Valadares Airport to Belo Horizonte-Pampulha Airport in Belo Horizonte, Brazil, goes 48 kilometers off-course and crashes into Mount Cipó in the Serra do Cipó Mountains, killing all 19 people on board.

References

1954
1954-05
1954-05